The Bidvest Wanderers Stadium is a cricket stadium, situated just south of Sandton in Illovo, Johannesburg in Gauteng Province, South Africa. Test, One Day and First class cricket matches are played here. The stadium has a seating capacity of 34,000. The ground is among the most historically significant cricket grounds of the twenty-first century. It has staged some of the most important matches in ODI and T20I history, and has witnessed a number of outstanding world records.

The 2003 Cricket World Cup final was held at the Wanderers Stadium. This stadium also hosted one of the greatest One-Day International matches. The match was played between South Africa and Australia in which a world record score of 434 was chased down by South Africa. It hosted matches of the 2007 ICC World Twenty20 including the first match and the final which was won by India, who defeated Pakistan.

Key
 * denotes that the batsman was not out.
 Inns. denotes the number of the innings in the match.
 Balls denotes the number of balls faced in an innings.
 NR denotes that the number of balls was not recorded.
 Parentheses next to the player's score denotes his century number at the Wanderers.
 The column title Date refers to the date the match started.
 The column title Result refers to whether the player's team won, lost or ended in a draw, a tie or a no result.

Test centuries

The following table summarises the Test centuries scored at the Wanderers.

One Day International centuries

The following table summarises the One Day International centuries scored at the Wanderers.

Twenty20 International centuries

The following table summarises the Twenty20 International century scored at the Wanderers.

References 

Lists of international cricket centuries by ground
Cricket grounds in South Africa
Centuries
Centuries